May H. Gilruth (July 19, 1885 – October 23, 1962) was an American artist/painter.

Personal background 

She was born Anna May Hardman in Jane Lew, West Virginia. She disliked her given first name Anna and never used it.
She married Irwin T. Gilruth in 1917 and had two children.

She died in Chicago, Illinois on October 23, 1962.

Career 
Gilruth worked primarily in pencil, watercolors, woodcuts and oil paints. She was most active in the 1930s to the 1950s, appearing in four major exhibitions, including The Art Institute of Chicago in 1945. She was a member of the National Association of Women Artists, Washington, DC.

Partial list of Exhibitions 
Annual Exhibition of Works by Chicago and Vicinity Artists, AIC, 1934–44. 
International Water Color Exhibition, AIC, 1935 
American Watercolor Society, NYC, 1937 
National Association of Women Painters & Sculptors, 1938 
Watercolor Annual, Pennsylvania Academy of Fine Arts, Philadelphia, 1939

References

1885 births
1962 deaths
American women painters
Painters from West Virginia
Artists from Chicago
People from Lewis County, West Virginia
20th-century American painters
20th-century American women artists